The 1892 United States presidential election in Vermont took place on November 8, 1892, as part of the 1892 United States presidential election. Voters chose four representatives, or electors to the Electoral College, who voted for president and vice president.

Vermont voted for the Republican nominee, incumbent President Benjamin Harrison, over the Democratic nominee, former President Grover Cleveland, who was running for a second, non-consecutive term. Harrison won Vermont by a margin of 38.83%.

With 68.09% of the popular vote, Vermont would be Harrison's strongest victory in terms of percentage in the popular vote.

Results

Results by county

See also
 United States presidential elections in Vermont

References

Vermont
1892
1892 Vermont elections